Plagiobothrys humistratus is a species of flowering plant in the borage family known by the common names dwarf popcornflower or low popcornflower. It is endemic to the Central Valley of California, where it grows in grassland habitats, including vernal pools and other wetland areas.

Description
Plagiobothrys humistratus is an annual herb growing prostrate, with stems extending up to 40 centimeters in length. The leaves along the stem are 3 to 8 centimeters long and coated in rough hairs. The inflorescence is a series of tiny white flowers accompanied by bracts. Each five-lobed flower is 1 or 2 millimeters in length. The fruit is a narrow oblong nutlet under 3 millimeters in length, often coated in minute bristles.

References

External links
Jepson Manual Treatment: Plagiobothrys humistratus
Plagiobothrys humistratus Photo gallery

humistratus
Endemic flora of California
Natural history of the Central Valley (California)